Débora Fernandes da Costa (12 August 1991) is a Brazilian basketball player for Sesi Araraquara and the Brazilian national team.

Career

Club
She started practicing the sport at the age of 8, growing an interest due to her sister training basketball and the fact they living in a city with a traditional club, ADCF Americana. Playing for Americana, she won the Brazilian championship twice, in 2011 and 2013.

International
After many years in the youth Brazilian teams, Costa was given a chance at the senior squad once Americana coach Luiz Augusto Zanon assumed the Brazilian national team in 2013. As part of the rotation replacing her idol Adrianinha, Costa won two South American Championships and a bronze at the 2013 FIBA Americas Championship for Women, and competed at the 2014 FIBA World Championship, and the 2015 Pan American Games.

References

External links
LBF Profile

1991 births
Living people
Brazilian women's basketball players
Point guards
Basketball players at the 2015 Pan American Games
Basketball players at the 2019 Pan American Games
Pan American Games medalists in basketball
People from Americana, São Paulo
Shooting guards
Pan American Games gold medalists for Brazil
Medalists at the 2019 Pan American Games
Sportspeople from São Paulo (state)